Justine Ayebazibwe Kashaija also known as Justine Kashaija(born 23 July 1972) is a Ugandan human resource manager, entrepreneurship expert and politician. She was the Woman MP for Isingiro District and is a representative of NRM, the ruling political party .  and she lost to Claire Mugumya in 2021 general election to represent people in the 11th parliament of Uganda. She succeeded Grace Isingoma Byarugaba who she defeated in the party's primary elections in 2015. In the 10th Parliament, she serves as a member of the Committee on Health and the Committee on Commissions, State Authorities & State Enterprises. She also a member of the NRM Parliamentary Caucus.

See also 
Isingiro District
Parliament of Uganda
National Resistance Movement.
List of members of the tenth Parliament of Uganda.

References

External links 
 Website of the Parliament of Uganda

Living people
1972 births
Members of the Parliament of Uganda
People from Isingiro District
People from Western Region, Uganda
Active politicians
Makerere University Business School alumni
21st-century Ugandan women politicians
21st-century Ugandan politicians